Ji Xiangqi (born October 1960) is a former Chinese politician and business executive. He was the Vice Governor of Shandong and the President of Shandong Commercial Group (d.b.a. Lushang Group). On January 4, 2018, Ji Xiangqi was placed under investigation by the Communist Party's anti-corruption agency.

Early life and education
Ji Xiangqi was born in October 1960. He graduated from Qingdao Vocational and Technical College of Hotel Management, and obtained the Executive Master of Business Administration (EMBA) degree of Nankai University.

Career 
In 1992, he was appointed as deputy manager of Shandong World Trade Center, and later promoted to Manager. He was named as President of Shandong Commercial Group (d.b.a. Lushang Group) from 2002 to 2010.

In 2013, Ji was appointed as the Vice Governor of Shandong.

Investigation
On January 4, 2018, Ji Xiangqi was placed under investigation by the Central Commission for Discipline Inspection, the party's internal disciplinary body, for "serious violations of regulations". He was expelled from the Communist Party on February 13.

On November 1, 2018, Ji Xiangqi stood trial for taking bribes and embezzlement at the Intermediate People's Court of Jinzhong in Shanxi. Ji Xiangqi took advantage of his position to benefit organizations on matters related to business cooperation and project contracting between 2003 and 2017, when he successively held different posts. He was charged with accepting money and property worth more than 25.71 million yuan (about 3.7 million U.S. dollars). He later pleaded guilty. On March 19, 2019, Ji was sentenced to 14 years for taking bribes and embezzlement and fined 3 million yuan.

References

1960 births
Chinese Communist Party politicians from Shandong
People's Republic of China politicians from Shandong
Political office-holders in Shandong
Businesspeople from Shandong
Living people
Politicians from Linyi
Nankai University alumni
Expelled members of the Chinese Communist Party
Chinese politicians convicted of corruption